The People's Supreme Court of the Lao People's Democratic Republic is the highest body of judicial power in Laos.

References

External links

Law of Laos